Orange Pear Apple Bear is a children's book written by award-winning author and illustrator Emily Gravett. Throughout the book only the four words "orange, pear, apple" and "bear" are used, with the exception of a single use of the word "there" on the last page, but are placed in a different order every time.

The book is aimed to help young children improve their reading and rhyming skills and was published by MacMillan in 2006.

2006 children's books
British picture books
Books about bears
Macmillan Publishers books